Chi-X may refer to:

 Chi-X Global, an operator of exchanges for trading equities
 BATS Chi-X Europe, a London-based equity exchange